Loshchinskaya is a rural locality (a village) in Mishutinskoye Rural Settlement, Vozhegodsky District, Vologda Oblast, Russia. The population was 12 as of 2002.

Geography 
Loshchinskaya is located 71 km east of Vozhega (the district's administrative centre) by road. Glazunovskaya is the nearest rural locality.

References 

Rural localities in Vozhegodsky District